Lloyd Aviation was an Australian regional airline established in 1969. The airline ceased operations on 30 September 1990.

History 
Lloyd Aviation was established in 1969 as Lloyd Aviation Jet Charter Pty. Ltd and began charter operations in the same year. In 1985 the airline acquired a 79-seat Fokker F.28 and began operating a twice-daily Adelaide to Moomba route on behalf of energy company, Santos. In 1986 Lloyd Aviation began operating EMB-110 Bandeirantes in South Australia. These aircraft began serving Kingscote, Olympic Dam, Port Lincoln and Whyalla from Adelaide. On 10 March 1986 Lloyd Aviation began operating routes to and from Broken Hill just after Airlines of S.A terminated theirs Also during March 1986 Lloyd Aviation introduced Cessna Citation jets on their Adelaide to Port Lincoln and Adelaide to Whyalla routes (however these aircraft were soon withdrawn and replaced with Bandeirantes & Cessna 402s). By 1987 the airline was operating a fleet of 34 aircraft, based throughout the Northern Territory and South Australia.

On 1 June 1987 Lloyd Aviation began operations in Queensland on behalf of Ansett Australia. The airline established a base at Brisbane and soon began serving Bundaberg, Gladstone, Biloela/Thangool, Blackwater and Emerald. Soon after commencing operations in Queensland, the airline was sold to Bodas Pty. Ltd. During the later months of 1987 the airline scaled back its routes from Adelaide to Olympic Dam, Port Lincoln and Whyalla, but maintained its services to Kingscote. The airline also began using chartered Rockwell Aero Commanders on some services from Brisbane. On 11 November Lloyd Aviation introduced the 25-seat Mohawk 298 on the  Brisbane to Bundaberg and Gladstone route on behalf of Ansett Australia. However these new Mohawk 298s performed poorly in Australian conditions and were later cited by staff as being a 'technical, operational and financial disaster'.

In the late 1980s Lloyd Aviation began to decline with the company selling off its Queensland division to Norfolk Group (with some of the routes, assets and staff transferred to Queensland Pacific Airlines) and ceasing all operations from Adelaide, with the exception of their Kingscote service. During the pilots' dispute of 1989 Lloyd Aviation began operating a leased Fokker F.28 to and from Norfolk Island on behalf of East-West Airlines. During December 1989 the airline also introduced Short 330s on the Adelaide to Kingscote route, with the aircraft also being used for freight. In 1990, with the airline continuing to decline the decision was made to merge Lloyd Aviation with Skywest Airlines with the 21 aircraft in the airline fleet going to Skywest. On 30 September, Lloyd Aviation operated its final flight from Kingscote to Adelaide and subsequently ceased all operations.

Destinations 
Throughout its existence the airline operated to destinations such as:
Adelaide
Biloela/Thangool
Blackwater
Brisbane
Bundaberg
Emerald
Gladstone 
Kingscote
Norfolk Island
Olympic Dam
Port Lincoln
Whyalla

Fleet 

Throughout its existence, Lloyd Aviation operated:

 Beechcraft King Air
 Bell 206
 CASA C-212
 Cessna 402C
 Cessna 441
 Cessna 550 Citation II
 Embraer 110
 Embraer 120 (deposits paid, but never delivered)
 Fokker F.28 Mk. 4000
 Mohawk 298
 Learjet 35
 Rockwell 690
 Short 330
 Sikorsky S-76

See also 

 Queensland Pacific Airlines

References 

Defunct airlines of Australia
1969 establishments in Australia
1990 disestablishments in Australia